The 182nd New York State Legislature, consisting of the New York State Senate and the New York State Assembly, met in Albany from January 5, 1977, to December 31, 1978, during the third and fourth years of Hugh Carey's governorship.

Background
Under the provisions of the New York Constitution of 1938 and the U.S. Supreme Court decision to follow the One man, one vote rule, re-apportioned in 1971, and amended in 1974, by the Legislature, 60 Senators and 150 assemblymen were elected in single-seat districts for two-year terms. Senate and Assembly districts consisted of approximately the same number of inhabitants, the area being apportioned contiguously without restrictions regarding county boundaries.

At this time there were two major political parties: the Republican Party and the Democratic Party.  The Conservative Party, the Liberal Party, the Communist Party, the Socialist Workers Party, the Libertarian Party and the Labor Party also nominated tickets.

Elections
The New York state election, 1976, was held on November 2. The only statewide elective offices up for election was a U.S. Senator from New York. Democrat Daniel Patrick Moynihan, with Liberal endorsement, defeated the incumbent Conservative James L. Buckley who had Republican endorsement. The approximate party strength at this election, as expressed by the vote for U.S. Senator, was: Democrats 3,239,000; Republicans 2,525,000; Conservatives 311,000; Liberals 184,000; Communists 25,000; Socialist Workers 16,000; Libertarians 11,000; and Labor 7,000.

Eight of the eleven women members of the previous legislature—State Senators Carol Bellamy (Dem.), a lawyer of Brooklyn; Karen Burstein (Dem.), a lawyer of Lawrence; and Linda Winikow (Dem.), of Spring Valley; and Assemblywomen Jean Amatucci (Dem.), a registered nurse of White Lake; Elizabeth Connelly (Dem.), of Staten Island; Estella B. Diggs (Dem.), of the Bronx; Mary B. Goodhue (Rep.), a lawyer of Mount Kisco; and Gerdi E. Lipschutz (Dem.), of Queens—were re-elected. Mary Rose McGee (Dem.), of Huntington, was also elected to the Assembly.

The New York state election, 1977, was held on November 8. No statewide elective offices were up for election. Two vacancies in the Assembly were filled. State Senator Carol Bellamy was elected President of the New York City Council.

On February 14, 1978, Pinny Cooke (Rep.) was elected to fill a vacancy in the Assembly; and on April 11, 1978, Olga A. Méndez (Dem.) was elected to fill a vacancy in the State Senate.

Sessions
The Legislature met for the first regular session (the 200th) at the State Capitol in Albany on January 5, 1977; and recessed indefinitely on July 15.

Stanley Steingut (Dem.) was re-elected Speaker.

Warren M. Anderson (Rep.) was re-elected Temporary President of the State Senate.

The Legislature met for the second regular session (the 201st) at the State Capitol in Albany on January 4, 1978; and recessed indefinitely on June 24.

On March 14, 1978, Assemblywoman Jean Amatucci had a baby son, becoming the first New York state legislator to give birth during her elected term.

State Senate

Senators
The asterisk (*) denotes members of the previous Legislature who continued in office as members of this Legislature.

Note: For brevity, the chairmanships omit the words "...the Committee on (the)..."

Employees
 Secretary: Roger C. Thompson

State Assembly

Assemblymen
The asterisk (*) denotes members of the previous Legislature who continued in office as members of this Legislature.

Note: For brevity, the chairmanships omit the words "...the Committee on (the)..."

Employees
 Clerk: Catherine A. Carey

Notes

Sources
 Election Day Doesn't Change Scene in Legislature in the Palladium–Times, of Oswego, on November 3, 1976
 Republicans Gain a Seat in Albany in The New York Times on February 16, 1978 (subscription required)
 Conklin Retiring As State Senator in the Schenectady Gazette, of Schenectady, on June 20, 1978

182
1977 in New York (state)
1978 in New York (state)
1977 U.S. legislative sessions
1978 U.S. legislative sessions